A list of films produced in Hong Kong in 1981:

1981

References

External links
 List of Hong Kong films released in 1981
 Hong Kong films of 1981 at HKcinemamagic.com

1981
Lists of 1981 films by country or language
1981 in Hong Kong